The Labour League of Youth was the youth organisation of the British Labour Party from 1926 to the 1960s. Two separate organisations existed, separated by the Second World War, the post-war League being more tightly controlled by the party. In the 1930s the League included far left elements, such as Trotskyists and Communists; the chairman in its last years, Ted Willis, worked with and later became secretary of the YCL. The organisation accepted members from the ages of 16 to 25.

Successors
Labour Party Young Socialists
Young Labour (UK)

References

1926 establishments in the United Kingdom
1960s disestablishments in the United Kingdom
History of the Labour Party (UK)
Organisations associated with the Labour Party (UK)
Political parties established in 1926
Political parties disestablished in the 1960s
Youth wings of political parties in the United Kingdom